The Organisation of African First Ladies against HIV/AIDS (OAFLA) is a nongovernmental, not-for-profit organization founded in 2002 by 37 African first ladies.

The Organisation of African First Ladies against HIV/AIDS works to cultivate a spirit of solidarity and the exchange of experiences among African first ladies and increase the capacity of First Ladies and other women leaders to advocate for effective solutions to respond to the ongoing HIV/AIDS epidemic, and acts against stigma and discrimination in the fight against HIV/AIDS, develops  partnerships with international, regional and local donors, organizations, and partners, and raises awareness, develops, and supports prevention, treatment, and care programs.

History

In 2002, thirty-seven African first ladies met in Geneva at a meeting facilitated by UNAIDS and the International AIDS Trust (IAT). As a result of this meeting, the organization of African First Ladies against HIV/AIDS (OAFLA) was established as a collective voice for Africa’s most vulnerable people, women and children infected and affected by the HIV/AIDS pandemic.

Since then, OAFLA has transformed itself from a forum of ideas to an institution capable of providing the continent-wide leadership needed to bring about change in peoples’ lives. With its permanent secretariat in Addis Ababa, Ethiopia, OAFLA has moved from addressing the symptoms of the HIV/AIDS crisis to the root causes of poverty and the overall inequality of women in the region.

Work and Campaigns
The organisation and its members have taken on various causes including HIV/AIDS, PMTCT, maternal death, child mortality, women's empowerment, and youth empowerment.

Member Countries
The member countries and leaders as of 2014 are listed below:
 The People’s Democratic Republic of Algeria
 The Republic of Angola
 The Republic of Benin
 Burkina Faso
 The Republic of Burundi
 The Republic of Cape Verde
 The Central African Republic
 The First Lady of Chad
 The Islamic Federal Republic of the Comoros
 The Republic of the Congo
 The Democratic Republic of Congo
 The Republic of Côte d’Ivoire
 The Arab Republic of Egypt
 The Republic of Equatorial Guinea
 The Federal Democratic Republic of Ethiopia
 The Gabonese Republic
 The Republic of The Gambia
 The First Lady of Ghana
 The Republic of Guinea
 The Republic of Guinea Bissau
 The First Lady of Kenya
 The Kingdom of Lesotho
 The Great Socialist People’s Libyan Arab Jamahiriya
 The Republic of Madagascar
 The Republic of Malawi
 The Republic of Mali
 The Republic of Mauritius
 The Republic of Mozambique
 The First Lady of Namibia
 The First Lady of Niger
 The Federal Republic of Nigeria
 The Republic of Rwanda
 The Republic of Senegal
 The Republic of Sierra Leone
 The Republic of South Africa
 The Republic of Somalia
 The Republic of South Sudan
 The First Lady of Sudan
 The Kingdom of Swaziland
 The United Republic of Tanzania
 The Republic of Tunisia
 The Republic of Uganda
 The Republic of Zambia
 The Republic of Zimbabwe

Steering Committee
The steering committee is composed of nine members representing the four regions within the continent.

Presidents of OAFLA

Recognition
In January 2007, Georgetown University awarded its fifth annual John Thompson Legacy of a Dream Award to the Organisation of African First Ladies Against HIV/AIDS for its leadership and service toward the ideals of Dr. Martin Luther King, Jr.

In January 2017, the former First Lady of Ghana, Lordina Mahama was presented an award from UNAIDS for her  work during her term in office as the President of the Organisation of African First Ladies Against HIV/AIDS (OAFLA).

See also
 Jeannette Kagame

Notes

External links
 OAFLA's website

Organisations based in Addis Ababa
HIV/AIDS prevention organizations
Medical and health organisations based in Ethiopia
2002 establishments in Ethiopia
Medical and health organizations based in Africa
Organizations established in 2002